Arlington Antebellum Home & Gardens, or Arlington Historic House, is a former plantation house and  of landscaped gardens near downtown Birmingham, Alabama.  The two-story frame structure was built between 1845–50 and features antebellum-era Greek Revival architecture. The house serves as a decorative arts museum, featuring a collection of 19th-century furniture, textiles, silver, and paintings. The garden features a restored garden room that is used for special events.  The house was added to the National Register of Historic Places on December 2, 1970, as Arlington, and has also been known as the Mudd-Munger House.

History
The classic Greek revival style architecture of this two-story home was the construction of a settler from Georgia by the name of Stephen Hall in 1822. Hall came to Birmingham to assist in the building process of a new courthouse and jail. He acquired the original seventeen acres of land and began construction of the future Arlington Home and Gardens.[ii] In 1840 Hall's son, Samuel inherited the plantation, but died two years later, leaving his loved ones with a large debt to pay off.[iii] Because of this debt the family was forced to auction off the plantation for a mere 600 dollars to a man by the name of William Mudd.[iv] Mudd served over twenty years as a Circuit Court Judge in Elyton until he resigned in 1883.[v] Judge Mudd purchased an adjacent eighty acres and[vi] added greatly to the site which he named it “The Grove”.  (https://alarchitecture.ua.edu/arlington-home-and-gardens/).

In 1846 he married Florence Earle and began building a larger home in place of Hall's, which he called The Grove for the numerous old hardwoods surrounding the house site. Under Mudd's orders, enslaved laborers and craftsmen built a grand eight-room mansion in the Greek Revival style. (https://www.bhamwiki.com/w/Arlington_Antebellum_Home_%26_Gardens). Built between 1845 and 1850 by William S. Mudd in Elyton, the second county seat of Jefferson County, Birmingham, a city that Mudd helped to establish, eventually grew to encompass the former site of Elyton.  Arlington is one of the only surviving structures from the time of Elyton and is Birmingham's only antebellum mansion.  Arlington was used by Union troops while planning the burning of the University of Alabama.

The property went through several owners and in 1902 became the home of Robert S. Munger. Over the next twenty years he did many renovations including plumbing and electric lights. He had another structure moved across the street behind the main house which was used for a kitchen, dining room, sun parlor and sleeping quarters. Mr. Munger also had one of the first “motor cars” in Birmingham.

In 1953, a citizen's group and the City of Birmingham raised money to purchase Arlington.

The ashes of former Birmingham mayor George G. Siebels, Jr. are interred at Arlington.

See also
Arlington Park, an adjacent historic district on former area of Arlington

References

External links

Historic house museums in Alabama
Houses in Birmingham, Alabama
Museums in Birmingham, Alabama
National Register of Historic Places in Birmingham, Alabama
Houses on the National Register of Historic Places in Alabama
Houses completed in 1850
Greek Revival houses in Alabama
Antebellum architecture